The 2020 Arizona Diamondbacks season was the franchise's 22nd season in Major League Baseball and their 22nd season at Chase Field in Phoenix, Arizona as members of the National League West Division. They are managed by Torey Lovullo in his fourth season with the franchise. 

On March 12, 2020, MLB announced that because of the ongoing COVID-19 pandemic, the start of the regular season would be delayed by at least two weeks in addition to the remainder of spring training being cancelled. Four days later, it was announced that the start of the season would be pushed back indefinitely due to the recommendation made by the CDC to restrict events of more than 50 people for eight weeks.

On June 23, MLB commissioner Rob Manfred unilaterally implemented a 60-game season. Players reported to training camps on July 1 in order to resume spring training and prepare for a July 24 Opening Day.

The Diamondbacks finished the season 25–35, giving them their first losing season since 2016.

Offseason

Transactions

Season standings

National League West

National League Wild Card

Record vs. opponents

Detailed records

Game log
On April 18–19, 2020, the Diamondbacks were supposed to take on the San Diego Padres in the Mexico Series at  Alfredo Harp Helú Stadium in Mexico City. But due to the Pandemic, on March 19, the MLB cancelled the series.

|- style="background:#fbb;"
| 1 || July 24 || @ Padres || 2–7 || Paddack (1–0) || Bumgarner (0–1) || — || 0–1 || L1
|- style="background:#fbb;"
| 2 || July 25 || @ Padres || 1–5 || Lamet (1–0) || Ray (0–1) || — || 0–2 || L2
|- style="background:#cfc;"
| 3 || July 26 || @ Padres || 4–3 || Bradley (1–0) || Yates (0–1) || — || 1–2 || W1
|- style="background:#fbb;"
| 4 || July 27 || @ Padres || 2–6 || Quantrill (1–0) || Weaver (0–1) || — || 1–3 || L1
|- style="background:#cfc;"
| 5 || July 28 || @ Rangers || 4–1 || Kelly (1–0) || Gibson (0–1) || Bradley (1) || 2–3 || W1
|- style="background:#fbb;"
| 6 || July 29 || @ Rangers || 4–7 || Hernández (1–0) || Chafin (0–1) || Goody (1) || 2–4 || L1
|- style="background:#fbb;"
| 7 || July 30 || Dodgers || 3–6 || Stripling (2–0) || Ray (0–2) || Báez (1) || 2–5 || L2
|- style="background:#cfc;"
| 8 || July 31 || Dodgers || 5–3 || Rondón (1–0) || Treinen (0–1) || Bradley (2) || 3–5 || W1
|-

|- style="background:#fbb;"
| 9 || August 1 || Dodgers || 2–11 || Urías (1–0) || Weaver (0–2) || — || 3–6 || L1
|- style="background:#fbb;"
| 10 || August 2 || Dodgers || 0–3 || Kershaw (1–0) || Kelly (1–1) || Jansen (2) || 3–7 || L2
|- style="background:#fbb;"
| 11 || August 4 || Astros || 2–8 || Javier (1–0) || Bumgarner (0–2) || — || 3–8 || L3
|- style="background:#cfc;"
| 12 || August 5 || Astros || 14–7 || Ray (1–2) || McCullers Jr. (1–1) || — || 4–8 || W1
|- style="background:#cfc;"
| 13 || August 6 || Astros || 5–4 || Guerra (1–0) || Pressly (0–1) || — || 5–8 || W2 
|- style="background:#fbb;"
| 14 || August 7 || @ Padres || 0–3 || Davies (2–1) || Weaver (0–3) || Yates (2) || 5–9 || L1
|- style="background:#cfc;"
| 15 || August 8 || @ Padres || 3–2 || Kelly (2–1) || Paddack (2–1) || Bradley (3) || 6–9 || W1 
|- style="background:#fbb;"
| 16 || August 9 || @ Padres || 5–9 || Lamet (2–0) || Bumgarner (0–3) || — || 6–10 || L1
|- style="background:#cfc;"
| 17 || August 10 || @ Rockies || 12–8 || Young (1–0) || Gray (0–2) || Bradley (4) || 7–10 || W1
|- style="background:#fbb;"
| 18 || August 11 || @ Rockies || 7–8 || Estévez (1–0) || Ginkel (0–1) || Bard (1) || 7–11 || L1
|- style="background:#cfc;"
| 19 || August 12 || @ Rockies || 13–7 || Chafin (1–1) || Kinley (0–1) || — || 8–11 || W1
|- style="background:#cfc;"
| 20 || August 14 || Padres || 5–1 || Kelly (3–1) || Lamet (2–1) || — || 9–11 || W2
|- style="background:#cfc;"
| 21 || August 15 || Padres || 7–6 || Crichton (1–0) || Johnson (1–1) || Bradley (5) || 10–11 || W3
|- style="background:#cfc;"
| 22 || August 16 || Padres || 5–4 || Clarke (1–0) || Pagán (0–1) || Bradley (6) || 11–11 || W4
|- style="background:#cfc;" 
| 23 || August 17 || Athletics || 4–3 || Crichton (2–0) || Soria (2–1) || — || 12–11 || W5
|- style="background:#cfc;" 
| 24 || August 18 || Athletics || 10–1 || Weaver (1–3) || Montas (2–2) || — || 13–11 || W6
|- style="background:#fbb;" 
| 25 || August 19 || @ Athletics || 1–4 || Luzardo (2–0) || Kelly (3–2) || Hendriks (8) || 13–12 || L1
|- style="background:#fbb;" 
| 26 || August 20 || @ Athletics || 1–5 || Manaea (1–2) || Young (1–1) || — || 13–13 || L2 
|- style="background:#fbb;" 
| 27 || August 21 || @ Giants || 2–6 || Webb (2–2) || Ray (1–3) || — || 13–14 || L3
|- style="background:#fbb;" 
| 28 || August 22 || @ Giants || 1–5 || Anderson (1–1) || Grace (0–1) || — || 13–15|| L4 
|- style="background:#fbb;" 
| 29 || August 23 || @ Giants || 1–6 || Baragar (3–1) || Weaver (1–4) || — || 13–16 || L5
|- style="background:#fbb;" 
| 30 || August 24 || Rockies || 2–3 || Castellani (1–1) || Widener (0–1) || Bard (2) || 13–17 || L6 
|- style="background:#fbb;" 
| 31 || August 25 || Rockies || 4–5 || Díaz (1–1) || Crichton (2–1) || Bard (3) || 13–18 || L7 
|- style="background:#fbb;"
| 32 || August 26 || Rockies || 7–8 || Gray (2–3) || Ray (1–4) || Hoffman (1) || 13–19 || L8
|- style="background:#bbb;"
| — || August 27 || Rockies || colspan=7 | Postponed (Boycotts due to Jacob Blake shooting); Makeup: September 25
|- style="background:#cfc;" 
| 33 || August 28 || Giants || 7–4 || Gallen (1–0) || Anderson (1–2) || — || 14–19 || W1
|- style="background:#fbb;" 
| 34 || August 29 || Giants || 2–5 || García (2–1) || Weaver (1–5) || Rogers (2) || 14–20 || L1
|- style="background:#fbb;"  
| 35 || August 30 || Giants || 1–4 || Watson (1–0) || Crichton (2–2) || Coonrod (1) || 14–21 || L2
|-

|- style="background:#fbb;" 
| 36 || September 1 || @ Dodgers || 3–6 || Urías (3–0) || Young (1–2) || Jansen (10) || 14–22 || L3
|- style="background:#fbb;"
| 37 || September 2 || @ Dodgers || 2–3  || Jansen (2–0) || Guerra (1–1) || — || 14–23 || L4
|- style="background:#fbb;"
| 38 || September 3 || @ Dodgers || 1–5 || Kershaw (5–1) || Weaver (1–6) || — || 14–24 || L5
|- style="background:#cfc;"
| 39 || September 4 || @ Giants || 6–5 || Bergen (1–0) || Anderson (1–3) || Ginkel (1) || 15–24 || W1
|- style="background:#fbb;" 
| 40 || September 5 || @ Giants || 3–4 || Barager (4–1) || Bumgarner (0–1) || Watson (1) || 15–25 || L1
|- style="background:#fbb;"
| 41 || September 6 || @ Giants || 2–4 || Baragar (5–1) || Young (1–3) || Rogers (3) || 15–26 || L2
|- style="background:#fbb;"
| 42 || September 7 || @ Giants || 2–4 || Gausman (3–2) || Gallen (1–1) || Coonrod (2) || 15–27 || L3
|- style="background:#fbb;"
| 43 || September 8 || Dodgers || 9–10  || Jansen (3–0) || López (0–1) || — || 15–28 || L4
|- style="background:#fbb;"
| 44 || September 9 || Dodgers || 4–6  || McGee (3–1) || Ginkel (0–2) || Treinen (1) || 15–29 || L5
|- style="background:#cfc;"
| 45 || September 10 || Dodgers || 5–2 || Smith (1–0) || Gonsolin (0–1) || Bergen (1) || 16–29 || W1
|- style="background:#cfc;" 
| 46 || September 11 || Mariners || 4–3 || Young (2–3) || Kikuchi (2–3) || Crichton (1) || 17–29 || W2
|- style="background:#fbb;" 
| 47 || September 12 || Mariners || 3–7 || Sheffield (3–3) || Gallen (1–2) || — || 17–30 || L1
|- style="background:#fbb;"
| 48 || September 13 || Mariners || 3–7 || Sadler (1–0) || Weaver (1–7) || — || 17–31 || L2
|- style="background:#cfc;"
| 49 || September 15 || @ Angels || 9–8 || Mella (1–0) || Andriese (2–3) || Crichton (2) || 18–31 || W1
|- style="background:#cfc;"
| 50 || September 16 || @ Angels || 9–6 || Clarke (2–0) || Bundy (5–3) || Crichton (3) || 19–31 || W2
|- style="background:#fbb;"
| 51 || September 17 || @ Angels || 3–7 || Canning (1–3) || Young (2–4) || — || 19–32 || L1
|- style="background:#cfc;"
| 52 || September 18 || @ Astros || 6–3 || Gallen (2–2) || García (0–1) || Crichton (4) || 20–32 || W1
|- style="background:#fbb;"
| 53 || September 19 || @ Astros || 2–3 || Paredes (3–2) || Weaver (1–8) || Pressly (11) || 20–33 || L1
|- style="background:#fbb;"
| 54 || September 20 || @ Astros || 2–3 || Taylor (2–1) || Guerra (1–2) || Pressly (12) || 20–34 || L2
|- style="background:#cfc;"
| 55 || September 22 || Rangers || 7–0 || Smith (2–0) || Lyles (1–6) || — || 21–34 || W1
|- style="background:#cfc;"
| 56 || September 23 || Rangers || 7–3 || Mella (2–0) || Goody (0–2) || — || 22–34 || W2
|- style="background:#cfc;"
| 57 || September 25 || Rockies || 4–0  || Gallen (3–2) || Senzatela (5–3) || Crichton (5) || 23–34 || W3
|- style="background:#cfc;"
| 58 || September 25 || Rockies || 11–5  || Clarke (3–0) || Santos (0–1) || — || 24–34 || W4
|- style="background:#fbb;"
| 59 || September 26 || Rockies || 3–10 || Márquez (4–6) || Weaver (1–9) || — || 24–35 || L1
|- style="background:#cfc;"
| 60 || September 27 || Rockies || 11–3 || Bumgarner (1–4) || Freeland (2–3) || — || 25–35 || W1
|-

|-
| Legend:       = Win       = Loss       = PostponementBold = Diamondbacks team member

Roster

Minor league affiliations

References

External links
2020 Arizona Diamondbacks season at Baseball Reference
2020 Arizona Diamondbacks season Official Site
2020 Arizona Diamondbacks season at ESPN

Arizona Diamondbacks
Arizona Diamondbacks
Arizona Diamondbacks seasons